George Labram was an American engineer employed as Chief Mechanical Engineer at the De Beers diamond mines in Kimberley during the Siege of Kimberley.

Early life
Labram was born in Detroit, Michigan in 1859, but attended school at the Quincy Mine after his parents moved there around 1864.

Career
Labram started his working career at Samuel F. Hodge & Company in Detroit before moving to Chicago where he first worked at the MC Bullock Manufacturing Company and later at Fraser & Chalmers. From Chicago Labram moved to the Silver King Mine in Arizona and then became mechanical engineer on a smelter for Anaconda Copper. Following that Labram worked at Boston and Montana Consolidated Copper and Silver Mining Company for a short period before moving to the Butte and Boston Consolidated Mining Company where he worked for about a year as engineer in charge of machinery before moving to Dakota to erect a tin mill. At the World's Columbian Exposition in 1893 Labram ran a machinery exhibition.

In 1893 Labram was employed by the De Beers company in Kimberley to build and manage a crushing mill.  In 1898 he was promoted to chief engineer.  Under Labram's supervision as manager of the crushing plant, Fred Kirsten devised an automated diamond extraction process. Up to that time all diamonds were manually extracted by sight.

Second Boer War

Labram installed an emergency fresh-water supply system for the town, and designed a bulk refrigeration plant for perishable foodstuffs specifically for the storage of meat from cattle that had to be slaughtered as it could no longer be let to pasture.

During the siege Labram also built two armoured trains, manufactured munitions for the existing artillery available in the city, and built the one-off cannon affectionately named Long Cecil, after the chairman of De Beers, Cecil Rhodes.
Many of the tools needed for the manufacture of the gun had to also be manufactured in the De Beers workshop.

Labram was killed on 9 February 1900, less than a week before the siege was lifted, by a Boer shell that hit his room in the Grand Hotel on Market Square. Kekewich gave Labram a full military funeral, that was attended by thousands despite Boer shelling specifically targeting the procession.

De Beers provided well for Labram's widow and son after his death, with Mrs Labram receiving $500 per year for the remainder of her life and their 13-year-old son $1000 per year until he came of age.  Great Britain also granted Mrs. Labram a once-off sum of £1,000 for the services her husband rendered during the siege.

The importance of the role Labram played in the defence of Kimberley is probably best expressed in a letter from Robert Kekewich to Mrs. Labram:

The one request from the people of Kimberley that Labram was unable to deliver on was to produce some whiskey.

Legacy

The modern day suburb of Labram in Kimberley is named after George Labram.  The Honoured Dead Memorial, which prominently features Long Cecil and a memorial plaque to George Labram on its stylobate, is situated adjacent to the neighbourhood.

The memorial plaque reads

Further reading

References

External links

1859 births
1900 deaths
Engineers from Michigan
People from Kimberley, Northern Cape
19th-century American engineers
Second Boer War casualties
People from Detroit